The LIU Brooklyn Blackbirds women's basketball team represented the Brooklyn campus of Long Island University, located in Brooklyn, New York in NCAA Division I basketball competition. They played their home games at the Steinberg Wellness Center, formerly known as the Wellness, Recreation & Athletics Center, and were members of the Northeast Conference (NEC).

At the end of the 2018–19 school year, LIU merged its two athletic programs—the Division I program of the Brooklyn campus and the NCAA Division II program of its Post campus in Nassau County, New York—into a single Division I program that now competes as the LIU Sharks. The Sharks maintain Brooklyn's Division I and NEC memberships.

History
The Blackbirds began play in 1965. They have made one NCAA Tournament appearance (2001) and one WNIT appearance (2007), losing in the First Round each time, 101-29 to Connecticut and 91-79 to Iona, respectively.

NCAA tournament results

References

External links